Main–Broad–Grove Streets Historic District is a national historic district located at Oneida in Madison County, New York. The district contains 194 contributing buildings, including Cottage Lawn and the Farnam Mansion. It is predominantly residential in character but includes two schools, five churches, and one park.  It has a collection of residential types and styles from the 1830s to 1930s.

It was added to the National Register of Historic Places in 1983.

References

Historic districts on the National Register of Historic Places in New York (state)
Historic districts in Madison County, New York
National Register of Historic Places in Madison County, New York